Club Deportivo Gerena is a Spanish football team based in Gerena, Seville, in the autonomous community of Andalusia. Founded in 2006, it plays in Tercera División – Group 10, holding home matches at Estadio José Juan Romero Gil.

Season to season

8 seasons in Tercera División

References

External links
Official website 
La Preferente team profile 
Soccerway team profile

Football clubs in Andalusia
Association football clubs established in 2006
2006 establishments in Spain
Province of Seville